Dragon Ball is a Japanese media franchise.

Dragon Ball may also refer to:

 Dragon Ball (manga) (1984), original manga series
 Dragon Ball (TV series) (1986), first anime television series
 Dragon Ball: Curse of the Blood Rubies (1986), originally released as simply Dragon Ball, first anime film

See also
Bel and the Dragon, a deuterocanonical biblical tale incorporated as chapter 14 of the extended Book of Daniel
Dragon's Egg, a science fiction novel by Robert L. Forward
Dragon's egg, a fireworks pyrotechnic star
Dragonseeds, a video game where the player breeds and trains dragons
Dragonsphere, a point-and-click graphic adventure game
 Tide jewels, gemstone that the dragon holds and uses